Simnia spelta is a species of sea snail, a marine gastropod mollusc in the family Ovulidae, the ovulids, which are cowrie allies sometimes called "false cowries". It was first described in 1758 by the Swedish naturalist Carl Linnaeus.

Description

The shell is roughly egg or cigar-shaped with a flattened base. It is strong, thick, smooth and glossy, with inrolled edges at the sides of the long aperture on the underside. The colouring varies according to the species of gorgonian on which it is living. The background colour of the shell is white, yellow, pink or orange, often with white spots or dark spots, marbling or streaks, providing camouflage. As is commonly the case in Simnia species, the colour of all the visible soft parts normally matches the colour of the gorgonian on which the snail is grazing, as the pigment from the gorgonian is retained in the mantle of the mollusk.

Distribution
Simnia spelta was at one time considered to be endemic to the western Mediterranean Sea and the Adriatic Sea, but it is now known to occur also in the eastern Atlantic Ocean between the Bay of Biscay, the Canary Islands and Angola.

Ecology
Simnia spelta is a specialist predator on gorgonians of the genera Eunicella, Paramuricea and Lophogorgia. It feeds on the polyps and the coenenchyme, the living connective tissue that surrounds the horny skeleton, but does not graze excessively and therefore does not kill its host. The sexes are separate in this species, and fertilisation is internal. Eggs are laid on the branches of the host species and resemble the natural warty appearance of the stems.

The white gorgonian Eunicella singularis is one of the sea fans with which this snail associates. On this host the snail is normally white and mimics the twigs in appearance. It feeds and lays its eggs on the gorgonian branches. Afterwards, epibionts grow on the denuded branches.

References

External links
 

Ovulidae
Gastropods described in 1758
Taxa named by Carl Linnaeus
Fauna of the Adriatic Sea
Molluscs of the Atlantic Ocean